Noah Chris Schultz (born August 5, 2003) is an American professional baseball pitcher in the Chicago White Sox organization.

Amateur career
Schultz attended Oswego East High School in Oswego, Illinois, a suburb of Chicago. In his first start of the season in 2021, he struck out ten batters over four scoreless innings. Schultz opened the 2022 season as a top prospect for the upcoming draft. He missed a period during the season after contracting mononucleosis. Following the end of his high school season, he played for the Illinois Valley Pistol Shrimp of the Prospect League. He committed to play college baseball for the Vanderbilt Commodores.

Professional career
Schultz was selected by the Chicago White Sox in the first round with the 26th overall selection of the 2022 Major League Baseball draft. He signed with the team for $2.8 million.

References

External links

2003 births
Living people
Baseball players from Illinois
Baseball pitchers
United States national baseball team players